
Gmina Nisko is an urban-rural gmina (administrative district) in Nisko County, Subcarpathian Voivodeship, in south-eastern Poland.

Villages
Apart from the town of Nisko, Gmina Nisko contains the villages and settlements of Kończyce, Nowa Wieś, Nowosielec, Racławice, Wolina and Zarzecze.

Neighbouring gminas
Gmina Nisko is bordered by the town of Stalowa Wola and by the gminas of Bojanów, Jeżowe, Pysznica, Rudnik nad Sanem and Ulanów.

References

Polish official population figures 2006

Nisko
Nisko County